The John and Daisy May Livingston Ranch, in Harding County, South Dakota near Sorum, South Dakota, was listed on the National Register of Historic Places in 1987. It includes a house built in 1916.

References

Ranches on the National Register of Historic Places in South Dakota
National Register of Historic Places in Harding County, South Dakota
Buildings and structures completed in 1916